The Mary Island Light Station is a lighthouse located on the northeastern part of Mary Island in southeastern Alaska, United States.

History

Mary Island Light Station was opened in 1903, and was one of a series of staffed lights established by the U.S. Government to guide ships through the treacherous waters of Southeast Alaska's Inside Passage. In 1937, a concrete lighthouse and fog signal building replaced the original wood tower. Situated behind the light were two lightkeeper houses which housed the Coast Guard Lightkeepers. One of the houses burned down in 1965(?); the other house was moved off the island to nearby Ketchikan, Alaska.

In 1969 the station was automated and the radio beacon was removed. No other buildings and structures at the station stand today, other than an outhouse.

Actually, the northern of the two keepers dwellings was moved in 1964.  The southern dwelling was used by the 4 man crew until the station was decommissioned in 1969, and in 1970 the dwelling was moved.

It was listed on the National Register of Historic Places as Mary Island Light Station in 2005.

See also

 List of lighthouses in the United States
National Register of Historic Places listings in Ketchikan Gateway Borough, Alaska

References

External links
 
 Lighthouse Friends — Mary Island Lighthouse
 
 

1903 establishments in Alaska
Art Deco architecture in Alaska
Lighthouses completed in 1903
Lighthouses completed in 1937
Lighthouses on the National Register of Historic Places in Alaska
Moderne architecture in Alaska
Buildings and structures on the National Register of Historic Places in Ketchikan Gateway Borough, Alaska